Iban Mayoz Echeverría (born September 30, 1981, in San Sebastián, Basque Country) is a Spanish professional road bicycle racer, currently not under contract to any team. He began his career at Relax in 2004 before moving to ProTour team Euskaltel–Euskadi in 2006, and then to Karpin–Galicia in 2008.

Major results

2008 – Karpin–Galicia
Tour of the Basque Country
 Winner sprints classification
Euskal Bizikleta
 Winner sprints classification
2010 – 
Vuelta a Castilla y León
 Winner mountains classification

External links 
Profile at Euskaltel-Euskadi official website 

Cyclists from the Basque Country (autonomous community)
Spanish male cyclists
1981 births
Living people
Sportspeople from San Sebastián